Frank Norton Townsend (16 September 1875 – 25 May 1901) was an English cricketer. He played for Gloucestershire between 1896 and 1899. He was a British officer in the Second Boer War and was killed in Cape Colony in 1901.

References

1875 births
1901 deaths
English cricketers
Gloucestershire cricketers
Cricketers from Bristol
Gauteng cricketers
British military personnel killed in the Second Boer War
British Army personnel of the Second Boer War
British Army officers